I Officially Exist (هستم رسما) is the second hip-hop album by Salome MC (سالومه ), and the first full-length studio album by an Iranian female Hip Hop artist. Released with the alternative title "The Price of Freedom" on streaming platforms, it is a concept album, with each song in the album relating to one of the three aspect of human life: Physical, Social and Psychological.

Track listing

References

External links
Official website
Download from SoundCloud
Buy From iTunes
Buy From Amazon

2013 albums
Salome MC albums
Concept albums